Arnuero is a municipality in the province and autonomous community of Cantabria, northern Spain.

The municipality is located in the northeastern portion of the province, and includes three small villages : Arnuero, Soano and Isla. Isla has two seaside districts, popular tourism destinations,  Quejo (Cape Quejo) and Playa la Arena.

Towns
Arnuero (Capital)
Castillo Siete Villas
Isla e Isla Playa 
Soano

References

External links
Ayuntamiento de Arnuero

 

Municipalities in Cantabria